Jean Zuléma Amussat (21 November 1796 – 13 May 1856) was a French surgeon.

Amussat was born in Saint-Maixent, Deux-Sèvres.  He became a renowned physician whose primary contributions were in the field of genitourinary surgery. Most of his work was through a private practice he held in Paris. He is remembered for the eponymous "Amussat's method" or "torsion of the arteries", which is a procedure used to arrest arterial hemorrhaging. He was also an early practitioner of lithotripsy, which was a "minimally invasive" surgery to crush stones inside the bladder via the urethra. This operation necessitated use of a recently invented device known as a lithotrite.

Amussat has several eponyms related to him:
 Amussat's fold: abnormal folds of the membranous urethra at the level of the seminal colliculus.
 Amussat's method: torsion of the arteries to prevent arterial hemorrhaging.
 Amussat's operation: extraperitoneal colostomy in the lumbar region for obstruction of the colon.
 Amussat's valves: Spiral valves within the cystic duct. The cystic duct is the anatomical structure that joins the gall bladder to the common bile duct.

Partial bibliography
 . , T. 13, 1822. On lithotripsy.
 . . 33 pages. Paris, 1826, No. 186. – On the use of animal experiments in physiology.
 . 1827. – On urethral sounds. 
 . 1827 – On lithotripsy and lithotomy.
 "Amussat's lessons on retention of urine, caused by strictures of the urethra, and on the diseases of the urethra". Edited by A. Petit. Translated from the French by James P. Jervey, M. D. 3 p. 1., 246 pages. Charleston, S. C. J. Dowling, 1836.

External links
 Jean Zuléma Amussat at Who Named It
 Collection of Medical Antique Instruments

1796 births
1856 deaths
People from Deux-Sèvres
19th-century French physicians
French surgeons
Burials at Père Lachaise Cemetery